Park Beom-kye (born 27 April 1963) is a South Korean politician who served as Minister of Justice under President Moon Jae-in from 2021 to 2022 and a three-term parliamentarian representing Daejeon from 2012.

After passing the bar exam and completing subsequent training at the Judicial Research and Training Institute, Park began his career as a judge at Seoul Central District Court. In 1998 he was transferred to Jeonju District Court and in 2001 to Daejeon District Court.

In October 2002, Park ended his career at the court to join the presidential campaign of Roh Moo-hyun, who was expected to lose the election. After Roh's victory in the 2002 South Korean presidential election, Park continued to work for Roh as a member of his transition team and as a secretary at the Office of the President.

After failing to gain his party's nomination for the general election in 2004 or bi-election in 2007, Park finally became the party's candidate in the 2008 election. In 2012 he ran again for the same constituency and has represented Daejeon in the National Assembly since.

After  operation "Miracle" in late August 2021 successfully evacuated about 400 people from Afghanistan who worked with the Korean embassy, KOICA and Korean military missions, Park said his ministry would submit an amendment to Immigration Act to parliament so that "people who have made special contributions to Korea or who have expanded its common good" can file for a long-term F2 visa.

Education 
Park holds two bachelor's degrees - one in law from Yonsei University and the other in economics from Hanbat National University.

Electoral history

References 

Minjoo Party of Korea politicians
Yonsei University alumni
People from North Chungcheong Province
Living people
1963 births
Justice ministers of South Korea
South Korean judges